Rekeem Jordan Harper (born 8 March 2000) is an English professional footballer who plays as a midfielder for Exeter City on loan from  Ipswich Town.

A product of West Bromwich Albion's academy, Harper made his first appearance for the club in August 2017 and later spent time on loan at Blackburn Rovers in 2017 and at Birmingham City in 2021. Harper left West Brom to join Ipswich Town in June 2021.

Club career

West Bromwich Albion
Harper joined West Bromwich Albion at the age of 12. He spent 5 years in the West Brom academy before making his professional Albion debut on 12 August 2017 as a second-half substitute in the club's 1–0 win over AFC Bournemouth, in doing so becoming only the second Premier League player to have been born in the 2000s. On 31 August 2017, Harper signed his first professional contract with the club, a deal to run for two years.

Blackburn Rovers (loan)
On 31 August 2017, League One club Blackburn Rovers signed Harper on loan for the 2017–18 season. He made his first start for Rovers on 12 September 2017 in the club's 1–0 win over Scunthorpe United. He received a red card for a professional foul in an FA Cup tie against Crewe Alexandra on 3 December. He made 9 appearances for Blackburn before returning to West Brom in the New Year.

Return to West Bromwich Albion
After returning to West Brom, Harper made his first appearance of the 2018–19 season in an EFL Cup tie on 14 August, starting in a 1–0 win against Luton Town. He scored the first senior goal of his career on 27 April 2019, a 79-minute winner in a 2–1 win over Rotherham United in Albion's final home game of the 2018–19 season. He made 23 appearances over the course of the season, scoring once, helping West Brom to qualify for the EFL Championship play-offs following a 4th league placed finish. His performances during the season earned him the club's Young Player of the Year award. In July 2019 he signed a new three-year contract with West Brom.

Harper made his first appearance of the 2019–20 season as a second-half substitute in the opening match of the season, a 2–1 win against Nottingham Forest. Harper found regular game time limited during the season, making 4 starts and 6 substitute appearances in the league and helping West Brom to win promotion to the Premier League following a 2nd place finish in the Championship. He made 13 appearances in total during the season.

Following West Brom's return to the Premier League, Harper made his first appearance of the season on the opening match day, coming on as a substitute in a 0–3 loss to Leicester City. He scored his first goal of the season in the following match against Harrogate Town in an EFL Cup second round tie on 16 September, scoring Albion's opening goal in a 3–0 win with a shot from outside the 18-yard box. His only other appearance for West Brom during the 2020–21 season came as a substitute in a 0–4 loss against Arsenal on 2 January.

Birmingham City (loan)
Harper joined Championship club Birmingham City on loan on 21 January 2021 for the remainder of the 2020–21 season. He made his debut as a second-half substitute on 30 January in a 1–1 draw with Coventry City. He made 18 appearances in all during his time on loan at Birmingham.

Ipswich Town
On 25 June 2021, Harper joined Ipswich Town for an undisclosed fee, believed to be in the region of £500,000. He signed a three-year contract with the club, with the option of a further one-year extension. He made his debut for the club in the first game of the season against Morecambe on 7 August.

Crewe Alexandra (loan)
On 31 January 2022, Harper joined fellow League One side Crewe Alexandra on loan for the remainder of the 2021–22 season.

Exeter City (loan)
Harper joined League One side Exeter City on a season-long loan on 24 August 2022.

International career
Born in England, Harper is of Jamaican descent. In February 2017, Harper represented England U17 in matches against Portugal, Germany and the Netherlands. In September 2018, Harper started for England Under-19 against Belgium.

Career statistics

Honours
West Bromwich Albion
EFL Championship runner-up: 2019–20

Individual
West Bromwich Albion Young Player of the Year: 2018–19

References

External links
Rekeem Harper profile at the Ipswich Town F.C. website

2000 births
Living people
Footballers from Birmingham, West Midlands
English footballers
England youth international footballers
English people of Jamaican descent
Association football midfielders
West Bromwich Albion F.C. players
Blackburn Rovers F.C. players
Birmingham City F.C. players
Ipswich Town F.C. players
Crewe Alexandra F.C. players
Exeter City F.C. players
Premier League players
English Football League players
Black British sportspeople